Paulinus Costa (19 October 1936 – 3 January 2015) was the Roman Catholic Archbishop of the archdiocese of Dhaka from 2005 to 2011.

Career

Costa was born in Gazipur, Bangladesh. He was ordained as a priest on 21 December 1963. He was appointed the Bishop of Rajshahi on 11 January 1996, and was ordained on 26 April the same year.

On 9 July 2005 he was appointed the Archbishop of the Archdiocese of Dhaka by Pope Benedict XVI, replacing the deceased archbishop Michael Rosario.

In his official capacity, Costa worked to foster communal harmony in the Muslim-dominated country of Bangladesh. In recognition of his services, Costa was one of eight to receive an award from the Human Rights Legal Aid Society of Bangladesh for "significant contributions in defending human rights in Bangladesh".

Archbishop Costa retired on 22 October 2011 and was succeeded by Patrick D'Rozario.

Personal life

Costa studied theology at the Pontifical Urbaniana University in Rome and obtained a PhD in theology in 1981.

Death

He died on 3 January 2015 in Dhaka of a heart attack.

See also
 Christianity in Bangladesh
 Roman Catholicism in Bangladesh
 Archdiocese of Dhaka

References

1936 births
2015 deaths
Roman Catholic archbishops of Dhaka
21st-century Roman Catholic archbishops in Bangladesh
People from Gazipur District
Pontifical Urban University alumni
Roman Catholic bishops of Rajshahi